Jeanne Pelisson-Mallet (1873 in Royan, France – 1961), was a French painter.

Biography 

Jeanne Pélisson was a Post-Impressionist painter.

Beginning as a fauvist, she moved into a Post-Impressionist style and was affiliated with an art movement known as the School of Paris. She painted landscapes, still lifes, nudes and portraits.

Since 1920s Pelisson exhibited at the Salon des Tuileries. The painter exhibited at the Salon d'Automne, at the Salon des Indépendants.

In 1932, another major solo exhibition was held at the Galerie Mallet.

In the 1930s, Jeanne was a member and exhibited her works at Femmes Artistes Modernes (F. A. M.).
 
Her husband was Dr Raymond Mallet (1882-1936)

Illustrations 
 L'Archer (Toulouse); 1932-02

References

Notes 
 Bénézit, 1976 : Jeanne Pelisson-Mallet

External links 
 Le Monde illustré,  Paris, 1935-01-26, Salon des Indépendants, BnF, portrait Thérèse Dorny 
 1; 2; 1935, Galerie "Le Niveau"; BnF
 Comoedia (Paris); Galerie "de Paris", 1936; BnF
 Comoedia (Paris), 1942, Galerie "Le Dragon"; BnF
 

1873 births
1961 deaths
19th-century French painters
20th-century French painters
Landscape artists
French still life painters
French portrait painters
Symbolist artists
School of Paris
Post-impressionist painters
Modern painters
French illustrators
French women painters
French women illustrators
Fauvism
19th-century French women artists
20th-century French women artists
People from Royan